The Cleveland Institute of Art, previously Cleveland School of Art, is a private college focused on art and design and located in Cleveland, Ohio.

History
The college was founded in 1882 as the Western Reserve School of Design for Women, at first attended by one teacher and one pupil in the sitting room of its founder, Sarah Kimball. The school moved several times, first to the attic of the Old Cleveland City Hall, then to the Old Kelly homestead on Wilson Avenue (now East 55th Street). Having become a co-educational school, it was renamed the Cleveland School of Art in 1892. After unsuccessful attempts to merge the school with Western Reserve University, the school became independent. In the fall of 1905, the first classes were held in a newly constructed building at the corner of Magnolia Drive and Juniper Road in Cleveland's University Circle. Beginning in 1917, the school offered classes for children and adults on weekends and in the summer.

The school participated in the WPA Federal Art Project during the Great Depression (1930s). Medical drawing and mapmaking were added to the curriculum during World War II (1939-1945). The school began offering a Bachelor of Fine Arts degree in 1947 and it became the Cleveland Institute of Art the following year, in 1948. The college gradually incorporated more academic courses into the curriculum, while retaining its key objective to offer practical training.

In 1956 the school moved to a new building on East Boulevard that it would name for George Gund II, who served as the college's board president and generous patron from 1942 to 1966. In 1981 the college acquired the former Albert Kahn designed Euclid Avenue assembly plant which was built by Ford in 1914-1915 and added to the National Register of Historic Places in 1976. Cleveland Institute of Art named the building the Joseph McCullough Center For Visual Arts following remodeling.

In early 2013, CIA announced it would sell its East Boulevard building to the Cleveland Museum of Art and Case Western Reserve University. In 2015, the college unified its operations at the Euclid Avenue site, where it completed construction of an 80,000-square-foot building adjoined to the McCullough Center on the west, and also named for George Gund II.

This new George Gund Building houses: the Peter B. Lewis Theater, the new home of CIA's year-round, nationally acclaimed Cinematheque film program; the Reinberger Gallery for public exhibitions; and CIA's programs in Animation, Ceramics, Drawing, Game Design, Glass, Graphic Design, Illustration, Industrial Design, Interior Architecture, Jewelry + Metals, Life Sciences Illustration, Painting, Photography + Video, Printmaking, and Sculpture + Expanded Media. The building also houses the American Greetings Welcome Center; the Admissions and Financial Aid offices; and  administrative operations. The new building has been designed to look crisp and contemporary without detracting from the historic McCullough building next door. This campus unification fully connects CIA to the new Uptown development of retail, restaurants, and residential construction anchored by CIA to the east and the new home of the Museum of Contemporary Art Cleveland to the west. Uptown Phase II, at the corner of Euclid Avenue and Ford Drive, includes CIA's new freshman residence hall that opened in August 2014.

Academics
The institute offers a Bachelor of Fine Arts in many majors as well as study abroad programs, mobility programs, and internships. Services for students include Career Services and Center for Writing and Learning Support.

Other academic programs include:
 Continuing Education
 Pre-College Programs
 Summer Workshops
 Young Artist Programs

Accreditation
The school is accredited by the North Central Association of Colleges and Schools (NCA) and the National Association of Schools of Art and Design (NASAD).

Rankings
In 2020, Cleveland Institute of Art was named a Best Midwestern College by the Princeton Review. In 2015 CIA was the only college of art and design to achieve this designation. Princeton Review is an education services company widely known for its test preparation programs and college and graduate school guides.

In 2018–19, Money magazine named Cleveland Institute of Art to its "Best Colleges for your Money" ranking.

Facilities
 Cleveland Cinematheque, a nationally recognized alternative film theater, is part of Cleveland Institute of Art.
 The recently completed (2015) George Gund Building adjoins the historic Joseph McCullough Center for the Visual Arts at 11610 Euclid Avenue.
 Reinberger Gallery presents free rotating art exhibits, events and lectures. Visiting artists often present lectures and symposia. The gallery is closed on Sundays.
 CIA's Uptown Residence Hall houses some 130 first-year students in the Uptown Development on Euclid Avenue.

Notable professors and students

 Charles L. Sallée Jr., Painter, Printmaker, Muralist
 Shelby Lee Adams, Photographer
 Richard Anuszkiewicz, Painter
 Robert Banks, Filmmaker
 Brian Michael Bendis, comic book artist, writer of Ultimate Spider-Man
 Samuel Bookatz, artist
 Brian Bram, artist for American Splendor
 Marc Brown, creator of the popular children's books and animated series Arthur.
 Charles Burchfield, Painter
 Martha Burchfield, Painter
 Ray Burggraf, Artist and color theorist, professor
 Charles Cajori, Painter, professor
 Shirley Aley Campbell, Painter
 Mario Casilli, Celebrity photographer
 Susan Collett, Printmaker and ceramic sculptor 
 Scott Colosimo, entrepreneur and motorcycle designer
 Barbara Cooper, Sculptor
 Clarence Carter, Painter
 Stevan Dohanos, Illustrator
 Clara Driscoll
 Edris Eckhardt
 Jurgen Faust, design professor 
 Marshall Fredericks,  Sculptor
 Carl Gaertner
 April Gornik, Painter
 Sante Graziani, Academic educator, Lecturer, artist and teacher
 William Harper, Metals/Enameling artist
 Jerry Hirshberg
 Max Kalish
 Bob Paul Kane, (1937—2013) Painter
 Henry Keller
 Hughie Lee-Smith, artist and teacher
 Winifred Ann Lutz
 Robert Mangold,  Painter
 Leza McVey
 William McVey, sculptor
 John Paul Miller,  Metals artist
 Ryan Nagode, chief designer, Chrysler
 John Opper, painter
 Joe Oros,  Automotive Designer
 Betty Thatcher Oros, America's first female automotive designer.
 Viktor Schreckengost,  Product Designer
 Dana Schutz,  Painter
 Jenny Scobel, Painter
 Walter Sinz, designer of the Thompson Trophy and teacher at the school from 1911 to 1952
 Julian Stanczak, Painter
 Eric Stoddard, designer of the Chrysler Crossfire and Hyundai Genesis Coupe
 Judy Takács, Painter
 Toshiko Takaezu (1922–2011), American ceramic artist
 Paul Timman, prominent American tattoo artist and tableware designer
 Paul Travis,  Painter
 Luella Varney, sculptor
 Frank N. Wilcox,  Painter/Illustrator
 Thaddeus Wolfe, designer and artist
 Harold Zisla, painter

References

External links

 

 
Universities and colleges in Cleveland
Art schools in Ohio
University Circle
Educational institutions established in 1882
Art museums and galleries in Ohio
1882 establishments in Ohio
Private universities and colleges in Ohio